The Littlest Hitler is a 2006 collection of short stories by Ryan Boudinot.

Plot
The book has characters who have occupations such as drugstore workers and pharmacists. The short stories have things such as a cannabalistic mother, serial killers, zombies and terrorists. The last story is called "The Newholy" which has to do with immigration.

Reception
A Publishers Weekly review says, "Reminiscent of early Rick Moody or the short stories of Daniel Handler, each of Boudinot's 13 stories is a microcosm of weirdness imbued with imagination and maniacal wit". A Kirkus Reviews review says "When Boudinot writes shtick, he's tiresome. When he writes fully developed stories, he's abrasive, thought-provoking and explosively funny". The book was Publishers Weekly's book of the year.

References

External links
Willamette Week
Portland Mercury
The Seattle Weekly
The Puget News
USA Today
The Voice
The January Magazine

2006 short story collections
American short story collections